Salvia trijuga is a perennial plant that is native to Yunnan, Sichuan, and Xizang provinces in China, found growing on hillsides, streamsides, grasslands, thickets, forests, and valleys at  elevation.

Inflorescences are widely spaced 2-flowered verticillasters in terminal racemes or panicles, with a  blue-purple corolla with yellow spots.

Notes

trijuga
Flora of China